"Just Communication" is the debut single by J-pop duo Two-Mix, released by King Records on April 29, 1995. Composed by Shiina Nagano and Kōji Makaino, the song was used as the first opening theme of the anime series Mobile Suit Gundam Wing, and marked the band's breakthrough into mainstream.

The single peaked at No. 23 on Oricon's weekly singles chart. It sold over 264,000 copies and was certified Gold by the RIAJ.

Track listing
All lyrics are written by Shiina Nagano. All music is arranged by Two-Mix.

Chart position

Certification

Other versions 
Remixes of the song were released on the albums Two-(Re)Mix and BPM "Dance Unlimited". An alternate version titled "Just Communication II" was recorded on the 1998 EP Fantastix II Next. An English-language version was recorded on the 2000 self-cover album BPM Cube.

Cover versions 
 Sachi & Nao covered the song on the 1998 soundtrack album Super Robot Taisen F Kanketsu-hen: Vocal & Arrange Collection Gold.
 Yoko Ishida covered the song on the 2000 various artists album Para Para Max: The Power of New Animation Songs.
 Sanae Kobayashi covered the song on ShiinaTactix-Sana.K's 2008 album BPM 151 Tactix
 Minami Kuribayashi covered the song on the 2009 various artists album Gundam Tribute from Lantis.
 Yoko Hikasa covered the song on her 2014 live album Glamorous Live.
 Nami Tamaki covered the song on her 2014 cover album NT Gundam Cover.
 Sayaka Sasaki covered the song on her 2016 album Sayakaver. Hiroko Moriguchi covered the song on her 2019 album Gundam Song Covers.
 Peaky P-key covered the song on the 2021 soundtrack album D4DJ Groovy Mix Cover Tracks Vol. 1.
 Angela covered the song on the 2022 various artists album Two-Mix Tribute Album "Crysta-Rhythm"''.

References

External links 
 
 

1995 debut singles
1995 songs
Two-Mix songs
Gundam songs
Mobile Suit Gundam Wing
Japanese-language songs
King Records (Japan) singles
Songs written by Kōji Makaino